Bidens leptocephala, the fewflower beggarticks, is a North American species of flowering plant in the family Asteraceae. It is native to the southwestern United States (Arizona, New Mexico, western Texas) and northern Mexico (Chihuahua, Sonora, Baja California, Baja California Sur).

Bidens leptocephala is an annual herb up to 50 cm (20 inches) tall. Flower heads are sometimes borne one at a time, sometimes in groups of 2 or 3, each head yellow or white with disc florets and sometimes with ray florets. The species usually grows on streambanks.

References

External links
Arizona Cooperative Extension, Yavapai County Native & Naturalized Plants

leptocephala
Flora of the Southwestern United States
Flora of Mexico
Plants described in 1917